Peda Komera is a village in Gampalagudem Mandal in Krishna District of Andhra Pradesh State, India. It belongs to Andhra region. It is located 130 km towards north from District headquarters Machilipatnam. 80 km from State capital amaravathi.

Demographics
Telugu is the local language of Pedda Komera. In September 2018, the total population of Peda Komera is 2403, of which 1245 are male and 1,158 are female, living in 560 Houses. The total area of Peda Komera is 679 hectares.

References

Villages in Krishna district